Petar Mićin (born 29 September 1998) is a Serbian footballer who plays for Radnički Niš.

Club career

Vojvodina
Born in Novi Sad, Mićin passed Vojvodina youth school and joined the first team at the age of 18. He also spent his first six months of senior football as a bonus player with local club Crvena Zvezda, where he was playing on dual registration in second half of the 2016–17 Serbian League Vojvodina season. Returning to Vojvodina in summer 2017, Mićin passed the whole pre-season with the first team. He made his Serbian SuperLiga debut on 21 July 2017, in 1–0 home victory over Čukarički. Shortly after the official debut for Vojvodina's first team, Mićin asked to leave the club, which led to him being suspended by the club's management.

Čukarički
On the last day of the summer transfer window 2017, Mićin signed a five-year professional contract with Čukarički. He scored his first goal for new club in his debut match, for 2–0 away victory over Mačva Šabac on 8 September 2017. He scored a twice in a cup win against Jagodina on 20 September, as also the only for beating Zlatibor Čajetina in the same competition. Finally, Mićin scored his fifth goal in the first half-season against Red Star Belgrade on 26 November 2017.

Loan to Chievo
Mićin joined Chievo on loan from Čukarički in the period of 31 January 2018 to 30 June 2018.

Udinese
Mićin joined Udinese Calcio on 1 July 2018. He made his first team debut on the last matchday of the season, on 26 May 2019 against Cagliari in the 88th minute. Udinese won the match 2-1 securing 12th place in the Serie A at the end of the season.

Loan to Čukarički
On 2 September 2019, he returned to Čukarički on loan.

Loan to Sereď
Before closing of the summer transfer window, on 6 September 2021, Mićin signed a loan deal with Sereď until December 2021.

Napredak Kruševac
On 11 July 2022, Mićin joined Napredak Kruševac on a two-year contract.

Career statistics

References

External links
 
 
 

1998 births
Living people
Footballers from Novi Sad
Association football midfielders
Serbian footballers
Serbian expatriate footballers
Serbia youth international footballers
Serbia under-21 international footballers
FK Vojvodina players
FK Crvena Zvezda Novi Sad players
FK Čukarički players
A.C. ChievoVerona players
Udinese Calcio players
ŠKF Sereď players
FK Napredak Kruševac players
Serbian SuperLiga players
Serie A players
Slovak Super Liga players
Expatriate footballers in Italy
Serbian expatriate sportspeople in Italy
Expatriate footballers in Slovakia
Serbian expatriate sportspeople in Slovakia